The Wife's Secret is an 1846 historical play by the British writer George William Lovell. The play takes place in Dorset during the rule of Oliver Cromwell after the English Civil War. It premiered at the Park Theatre in Manhattan on 12 October 1846 with Charles Kean in the lead. It made its London debut at the Theatre Royal, Haymarket on 17 January 1848. The Haymarket cast included Charles Kean as Sir Walter Aymott, Henry Howe as Lord Arden, Ellen Kean as Lady Eveline Amyott, Benjamin Nottingham Webster as Jabez Sneed and Mary Anne Keeley as Maud. The Times praised Ellen Kean's performance, noting "the wife, is played to perfection".

References

Bibliography
 Nicoll, Allardyce. A History of Early Nineteenth Century Drama 1800-1850. Cambridge University Press, 1930.
 Pascoe, Charles Eyre. Our Actors and Actresses. The Dramatic List. David Bogue, 1880.
 Taylor, George. Players and Performances in the Victorian Theatre. Manchester University Press, 1993.

1846 plays
West End plays
British plays
Historical plays
Plays set in the 17th century
Plays set in England
Plays by George William Lovell